The 1986 Icelandic Cup was the 27th edition of the National Football Cup.

It took place between 22 May 1984 and 31 August 1986, with the final played at Laugardalsvöllur in Reykjavik. The cup was important, as winners qualified for the UEFA Cup Winners' Cup (if a club won both the league and the cup, the defeated finalists would take their place in the Cup Winners' Cup).

The 10 clubs from the 1. Deild entered in the last 16, with clubs from lower tiers entering in the three preliminary rounds. Teams played one-legged matches. In case of a draw, a penalty shoot-out took place (there were no replays, unlike in previous years).

Fram Reykjavik failed to retain the trophy, losing to ÍA Akranes in the final. They won their fifth Icelandic Cup, and so qualified for Europe.

First round

Second round

Third round

Fourth round 

 Entry of ten teams from the 1. Deild

Quarter finals

Semi finals

Final 

 Fram Reykjavik won their fifth Icelandic Cup, and qualified for the 1987–88 European Cup Winners' Cup.

See also 

 1986 Úrvalsdeild
 Icelandic Men's Football Cup

External links 
  1986 Icelandic Cup results at the site of the Icelandic Football Federation
  Results of the 1985 Icelandic Cup 1985 at RSSSF

Icelandic Men's Football Cup
Iceland
1986 in Iceland